Caras argentinas is a 1939  Argentine musical film drama directed by Carmello Santiago. The film premiered in Buenos Aires on May 18, 1939.

Cast
Francisco de Paula
Elisa Galvé
Miguel Leme
Aída Vignan

External links

1939 films
1930s Spanish-language films
Argentine black-and-white films
Tango films
1930s musical drama films
Argentine musical drama films
1939 drama films
1930s Argentine films